The Mahatma Phule Krishi Vidyapeeth, Rahuri is a university established on March 29, 1968. It became operational in October 1969. Thirty-three kilometers to the south is Ahmednagar city and fifty kilometers to the north is Shirdi. Newasa, land of saint Dnyaneshwar is 33 km from Rahuri. Ahmednagar is a historical city and was the capital of the Nizam rulers. It is famous for co-operative sugar and dairy industries. The annual average maximum and minimum temperature range between 30 and 40 °C and 10 to 20 °C. respectively.

Colleges

Constituent Colleges 
College Of Agriculture Pune, College of Agriculture Dhule, College of Agriculture Kolhapur, College of Agriculture Karad
College of Agriculture Nandurbar, Post Graduate Institute MPKV Rahuri, Dr. A. S. College of Agricultural Engineering and Technology, Rahuri, College of Agriculture Muktainagar, Punyashlok Ahilyadevi Holkar College of Agriculture

Apart from this many colleges are affiliated to this university.

MPKV offers Post Graduate education at its Central Campus, Rahuri and College of Agriculture, Pune, Kolhapur and Dhule; Ph.D. programme at Rahuri; M. Tech. (Agril. Engg.) at Rahuri is a high-quality faculty with modern laboratories.

Special infrastructure facilities for international students.

Faculty of Lower Agricultural Education offers Diploma courses in Agriculture through 9 constituent and 85 affiliated Agricultural Schools under MPKV.

State Level Biotechnology Center 

State Level Biotechnology Center has been established at the main campus of Mahatma Phule Krishi Vidyapeeth, Rahuri. Centre started M.Sc. degree programme in the subject of Agricultural Biotechnology with the intake capacity of 8 students for M.Sc (Agril. Biotechnology).

Alumni 

MPKV has alumni with numerous Agricultural Research Service Scientists and government officers working under State and Central Governments. Some meritorious officers in Indian Administrative Service like Dadasaheb Zagade ( IAS) Tanaji Satre (I.A.S), Prabhakar Deshmukh (I.A.S), Chandrakant Dalvi (I.A.S), Umakant Dangat (I.A.S), Shivaji Daund (I.A.S), Vikas Deshmukh (I.A.S), V.J Bhosale (I.A.S), Rajaram Mane(I.A.S), A.R Shinde (I.A.S), Shekhar Gaikwad (I.A.S) are notable alumni of MPKV. Apart from these many alumni from MPKV are working in State Services.

References

External links
Official website

 Agricultural universities and colleges in Maharashtra
 Education in Ahmednagar district
 Jyotirao Phule